Mulga may refer to:

Flora
 Acacia aneura (mulga or true mulga, a shrub or tree native to Australia)
 Mulga apple, its edible gall
 Any of many similar Acacia species, such as:
 Acacia brachystachya (umbrella mulga)
 Acacia citrinoviridis (black mulga)
 Acacia craspedocarpa (hop mulga)
 Acacia cyperophylla (red mulga)

Fauna
 Mulga parrot, a parrot of southern Australia
 Pseudechis australis, also known as the mulga snake
 Pseudechis weigeli, also known as the pygmy mulga snake
 Pygmy mulga monitor, a monitor lizard native to Australia
 Mulga dragon, a lizard native to Australia

Places
 In Australia, alternative term for the Bush or a wilderness regions; for example "up the mulga"
 Mulga (habitat), an Australian woodland or open forest habitat dominated by trees of the species Acacia
 Mulga Lands, an Interim Biogeographic Regionalisation for Australia region of Australia
 Mulga Creek, a river of New South Wales, Australia
 Mulga Queen Community, a community Western Australia, Australia
 Mulga, Alabama, a town in the United States
 Mulga, Ohio, a community in the United States
 Mulga Island, an island in Antarctica
 a former name of Brigalow, Queensland, Australia

People
 George "Mulga" Taylor (1861–1935), Australian labour leader and MP

See also
 "Mulga Bill's Bicycle", a poem written in 1896 by Banjo Paterson